The Women's 200 Individual Medley (or "I.M.") at the 10th FINA World Swimming Championships (25m) was swum on 18 December 2010 in Dubai, United Arab Emirates. 38 swimmers swam in the preliminary heats, with the top-8 finishers advancing to the final that evening.

Records
Prior to the competition, the existing world and championship records were as follows.

The following records were established during the competition:

Results

Heats

Final

References

Individual medley 200 metre, Women's
World Short Course Swimming Championships
2010 in women's swimming